Yan Yaping is a Chinese paralympic sport shooter. She participated at the 2016 Summer Paralympics in the shooting competition, being awarded the bronze medal in the women's 10 metre air rifle standing SH1 event.

References

External links 
Paralympic Games profile

Living people
Place of birth missing (living people)
Year of birth missing (living people)
Chinese female sport shooters
Paralympic shooters of China
Paralympic bronze medalists for China
Paralympic medalists in shooting
Shooters at the 2016 Summer Paralympics
Medalists at the 2016 Summer Paralympics